μ Pictoris, Latinised as Mu Pictoris, is a binary star system in the southern constellation Pictor. It is bright enough to be dimly visible to the naked eye, having a combined apparent visual magnitude of 5.69. Based upon an annual parallax shift of 4.31 mas as seen from Earth, the system is located roughly 760 light years distant from the Sun. As of 2010, the pair have an angular separation of 2.46 arc seconds along a position angle of 221°.

The primary, designated component A, is a blue-white star with a visual magnitude of 5.71 and a stellar classification of B9 Ve or B9 IVn. The first classification suggests is a B-type main-sequence star, with the 'e' suffix indicating a Be star. The second may instead indicate a somewhat more evolved B-type star that is spinning rapidly, resulting in "nebulous" absorption lines. Photometrically, it shows a pulsation period of 0.397 days, which is likely the same as the rotation period.

The secondary companion, component B, is a white-hued star of magnitude 9.43 with a classification of A8 V:p?. This indicates it is an A-type main-sequence star, with the 'p?' suffix suggesting it may be chemically peculiar while the ':' notation says there is some uncertainty about the general classification.

References

B-type subgiants
B-type main-sequence stars
A-type main-sequence stars
Binary stars
Pictor (constellation)
Pictoris, Mu
046860
031137
2412
Durchmusterung objects